Local elections were held in Hungary on October 12, 2014. It was the first local election according to the new Constitution of Hungary which went into force on 1 January 2012. The new electoral law entered into force that day.

Changes compared to 2010

 The two following municipal terms (2014-2019 and 2019-2024) will last for 5 years.
 The election rules for the General Assembly of Budapest has changed. Before 2014 the members of the General Assembly of Budapest were the mayor of Budapest and 32 members elected from party lists just the same way as the members of the General Assemblies of the counties are elected. From 2014 on, the 33 members of the city council are:
the mayor of Budapest
the 23 mayors of the districts of Budapest
9 members from compensation-lists of parties (Budapest mayor candidates and district mayor candidates can be listed on compensation-lists)

Levels of local governance
In Hungary there are two levels of local governance:
 General Assemblies of the 19 counties and the General Assembly of Budapest
 General Assemblies of villages, towns, cities (other than Budapest) and the General Assemblies of the 23 districts of Budapest

The votes
 in Budapest:
 for a mayor candidate of Budapest
 for a mayor candidate of the district (who will also be the representative of the district in the General Assembly of Budapest)
 for a candidate for being the representative of the electoral neighbourhood in the General Assembly of the district

 in towns and cities with population larger than 10,000 (other than Budapest)
 for a party-list for the General Assembly of the county
 for a mayor candidate of the town/city
 for a candidate for being the representative of the electoral neighbourhood in the General Assembly of the town/city

 in towns, villages with population lower than 10,000
 for a party-list for the General Assembly of the county
 for a mayor candidate of the town/village
 for as many candidates as the number of members of the General Assembly in the town/village (as these towns/villages are not further divided to electoral neighbourhoods)

 in villages that are administratively part of a town/city
 for a party-list for the General Assembly of the county
 for a mayor candidate of the town/city of which the village is administratively part of
 for a candidate for being the representative of the village in the General Assembly of the town/city

Results

Budapest

Mayor

Result of the mayoral election:

General Assembly of Budapest

General Assemblies of the counties

See also
 2014 Hungarian parliamentary election

References

2014 elections in Europe
2014 in Hungarian politics
Local elections in Hungary